Rhapsody was Ben E. King's eleventh album and tenth studio album, and his third record with Atlantic Records.

Many of the tracks in this album appear on the Let Me Live In Your Life album.  Rhapsody is not easily found online and is made 60% obsolete with the newer album a year later.  One known source for this album is Marv Goldberg's R&B Notebooks (link below).

Track listing

"Family Jewels" [3:38]
"Wonder Woman" [3:23]
"Let Me Live In Your Life" [5:03]
"Sweet Rhapsody" [3:57]
"Fly Away To My Wonderland" [4:06]
"No Deposit No Return"
"I Created A Monster"
"Somebody's Knocking'"
"One More Time"
"Fifty Years" [4:32]

External links

Marv Goldberg's R&B Notebooks - http://www.uncamarvy.com/BenEKing/beneking.html

Ben E. King albums
1976 albums
Atlantic Records albums